The Central Harbourfront is a waterfront site in Central, Hong Kong. It is the result of Central and Wan Chai Reclamation, and it sits to the east of ifc skyscraper.

The harbourfront is now the site of the Hong Kong Observation Wheel, AIA Vitality Park, Central Harbourfront Event Space, and Hong Kong ePrix of Formula E. The harbourfront is the best place on Hong Kong island to enjoy the Tsim Sha Tsui and Kowloon view of Victoria Harbour. At 8pm every night, visitors can enjoy the Symphony of Lights show from the Harbourfront.

Central Harbourfront Event Space

References

Central, Hong Kong
Coastal construction
Waterfronts
Music venues in Hong Kong